The 125th Street station was an express station on the demolished IRT Third Avenue Line in Manhattan, New York City as part of the extension of the Third Avenue Line north of 67th Street. It opened on December 30, 1878, and had three tracks and two levels. The lower level was built first and had two tracks and two side platforms for local trains. The upper level, built as part of the Dual Contracts, had one track and two side platforms for express trains. Simultaneously during the dual contracts period, IRT also expanded the Lexington Avenue Subway which included a station one block west of the el station. This station closed on May 12, 1955, with the ending of all service on the Third Avenue El south of 149th Street.

References

 

IRT Third Avenue Line stations
Railway stations closed in 1878
Railway stations closed in 1955
1878 establishments in New York (state)
1955 disestablishments in New York (state)
Former elevated and subway stations in Manhattan
Third Avenue
East Harlem